List of rivers in Arkansas (U.S. state).

For a list of dams and reservoirs in Arkansas, see List of Arkansas dams and reservoirs Rivers are listed by drainage basin, by size, and alphabetically.

By drainage basin
This list is arranged by drainage basin, with respective tributaries indented under each larger stream's name.

Red River

 Mississippi River
 Red River
 Black River (LA)
 Tensas River (LA)
 Bayou Macon
 Ouachita River
 Boeuf River
 Bayou D'Arbonne (LA)
 Cornie Bayou
 Bayou Bartholomew
 Saline River
 Hurricane Creek
 Moro Creek
 Smackover Creek
 Little Missouri River
 Terre Noire Creek
 Terre Rouge Creek
 Antoine River
 Hickory Creek
 Caddo River
 Loggy Bayou (LA)
 Flat River (LA)
 Red Chute Bayou (LA)
 Bodcau Bayou and Creek
 Bayou Dorcheat
 Sulphur River
 McKinney Bayou
 Little River
 Saline River
 Cossatot River
 Little Cossatot River
 Rolling Fork
 Mountain Fork

Arkansas River
 Mississippi River
 Arkansas River
 Bayou Meto
 Little Maumelle River
 Maumelle River
 Fourche La Fave River
 South Fourche La Fave River
 Cadron Creek
 Point Remove Creek
 Petit Jean River
 Illinois Bayou
 Big Piney Creek
 Mulberry River
 Poteau River
 James Fork
 Lee Creek
 Illinois River
 Flint Creek
 Sager Creek
 Hickory Creek
 Neosho River (OK)
 Elk River (OK)
 Big Sugar Creek
 Little Sugar Creek
 Tanyard Creek

White River

 Mississippi River
 White River
 Arkansas Post Canal
 La Grue Bayou
 Big Creek
 Cache River
 Bayou De View
 Bayou des Arc
 Little Red River
 Village Creek
 Black River
 Strawberry River
 Little Strawberry River
 Spring River
 Warm Fork Spring River
 Eleven Point River
 Fourche River
 Current River
 Little Black River
 North Fork River
 Bennetts River
 Buffalo River
 Little Buffalo River
 Crooked Creek
 Kings River
 Hickory Creek

St. Francis River
 Mississippi River
 St. Francis River
 L'Anguille River
 Tyronza River
 Little River

By size

Rivers are measured by their mean annual flow of water in cubic feet per second (cfs).  One cubic foot equals .0283 cubic meters.

Notes and sources:  There are two Richland Creeks and two Saline Rivers in Arkansas. Flow of rivers differs substantially between years and seasons.
Source for all rivers except St. Francis is the "USGS Water-Data Report – 2012" at http://waterdata.usgs.gov/ar/nwis/current/?type=flow&group_key=basin_cd;  The flow of the St. Francis River flow is estimated from US Army Corps of Engineers data at https://archive.today/20130708123645/http://w3.mvm.usace.army.mil/hydraulics/docs/historic/sfdata/sf13284d

Alphabetically
 Antoine River
 Arkansas River
 Bayou De View
 Bayou des Arc
 Bayou Macon
 Bennetts River
 Big Piney Creek
 Big Sugar Creek
 Black River
 Boeuf River
 Buffalo National River or Buffalo River
 Cache River
 Caddo River
 Cossatot River
 Current River
 Dorcheat Bayou
 Eleven Point River
 Flint Creek
 Fourche La Fave River
 Fourche River
 Glazypeau Creek
 Illinois River
 James Fork
 Kings River
 L'Anguille River
 L'Eau Frais Creek
 Lee Creek
 Little Antoine River
 Little Black River
 Little Buffalo River
 Little Cossatot River
 Little Maumelle River
 Little Missouri River
 Little Red River
 Little River (Red River tributary) in southwestern Arkansas
 Little River (St. Francis River tributary) in northeastern Arkansas
 Little Strawberry River
 Little Sugar Creek
 Maumelle River
 Mississippi River
 Mountain Fork
 Mulberry River
 North Fork River
 Ouachita River
 Petit Jean River
 Poteau River
 Red River
 Rolling Fork
 Sager Creek
 St. Francis River
 Saline River (Little River tributary) in southwestern Arkansas
 Saline River (Ouachita River tributary) in southern Arkansas
 Spring River
 Strawberry River
 Sulphur River
 Tanyard Creek
 Tyronza River
 White River

References
 USGS Geographic Names Information Service
 USGS Hydrologic Unit Map – State of Arkansas (1974)

See also
 List of rivers in the United States

Arkansas rivers
 
Rivers